Saint Joseph Warriors Football Club is based in New Kru Town, Monrovia Liberia. The team was established in  1967 by Revd. Brother Joseph Merino (from Catholic Hospital).

Achievements 
Liberian Premier League: 3
 1976, 1978, 1979.

Liberian Cup: 2
 1982, 2007.

Liberian Super Cup: 0

External links
St Joseph Warriors

Football clubs in Liberia
Sport in Monrovia
Association football clubs established in 1967
1967 establishments in Liberia